Phyciodes pulchella, the field crescent, is a butterfly of the family Nymphalidae. It is found in the Nearctic realm.

The wingspan is 24–36 mm. The butterfly flies from May to August in Canada.

The larvae feed on Asteraceae species.

Subspecies
Listed alphabetically:
P. p. camillus Edwards, 1871
P. p. deltarufa Scott, 1998
P. p. inornatus Austin, 1998
P. p. montana (Behr, 1863)
P. p. owimba Scott, 1998
P. p. pulchella
P. p. tutchone Scott, 1994
P. p. shoshoni Scott, 1994
P. p. vallis Austin, 1998

Similar species
Phyciodes cocyta – northern crescent 
Phyciodes batesii – tawny crescent
Phyciodes mylitta – Mylitta crescent
Phyciodes pallida – pale crescent 
Phyciodes tharos – pearl crescent

References

External links
Field Crescent, Butterflies and Moths of North America
Species Phyciodes pulchella - Field Crescent, BugGuide

Melitaeini
Butterflies of North America
Butterflies described in 1852
Taxa named by Jean Baptiste Boisduval